A Way of Life is a 2016 short crime drama film directed by Viraj Nayar and produced by Christopher Romano. The film stars Christopher Romano as a recently released ex convict struggling to find work before the week is up in order to pay his overbearing grandmother (Patsy Meck) rent money before she kicks him out of the house.

Film Festivals
Arizona International Film Festival
Diamond in the Rough Cut Film Festival

References

http://www.imdb.com/title/tt5293306/?ref_=ttpl_pl_tt
http://www.filmfestivalarizona.com/index.php?pg=17
http://mikesfilmtalk.com/2016/03/26/way-life-despondency-death/
http://www.phillyvoice.com/philly-film-projects-wait-and-watch-now/

2016 films
2010s English-language films